Matthew Ioannidis (born January 11, 1994) is an American football defensive tackle for the Carolina Panthers of the National Football League (NFL). He played college football at Temple and was drafted by the Washington Redskins in the fifth round of the 2016 NFL Draft.

Early years
Ioannidis grew up in the Ringoes section of Raritan Township, New Jersey and attended Hunterdon Central Regional High School. The middle of three boys, Matt and his brothers Andrew and Kevin, grew up playing football, basketball, and lacrosse.

College career
Ioannidis attended and played college football at Temple University from 2012 to 2015.

Statistics

Professional career

NFL predraft

Washington Redskins / Football Team
Ioannidis was selected by the Washington Redskins in the fifth round, 152nd overall, in the 2016 NFL Draft. On September 3, 2016, he was waived by the Redskins, but re-signed with their practice squad a day later. He was promoted to the active roster after Kedric Golston was placed on injured reserve.

Ioannidis made his NFL debut on September 25, 2016, in a 29–27 win against the New York Giants. He appeared in ten games during his rookie season, making seven tackles.

In 2018, Ioannidis played in 14 games with nine starts, recording 31 combined tackles, a forced fumble, and 7.5 sacks, which finished third on the team. On April 18, 2019, Ioannidis signed a three-year, $21.75 million contract extension with the team. Ioannidis finished the 2019 season setting new career highs with 64 tackles, 8.5 sacks, and one pass deflection.

Ioannidis tore his biceps in the Week 3 2020 season game against the Cleveland Browns and was placed on injured reserve. He finished the 2020 season with seven tackles and 1.5 sacks over three games. He tested positive for COVID-19 in November 2020 and was placed on the team's COVID-19 reserve list until recovering and being placed back on injured reserve later that month.
 On December 15, 2021, Ioannidis was placed on the COVID-19 reserve list, but reactivated five days later. Ioannidis was released on March 16, 2022.

Carolina Panthers
On March 18, 2022, Ioannidis signed with the Carolina Panthers.

References

External links
Carolina Panthers bio
Temple Owls bio

1994 births
Living people
American football defensive ends
American football defensive tackles
American people of Greek descent
Hunterdon Central Regional High School alumni
People from East Amwell Township, New Jersey
Players of American football from New Jersey
Sportspeople from Hunterdon County, New Jersey
Temple Owls football players
Washington Football Team players
Washington Redskins players
Carolina Panthers players